Rock Garden is a 2006 solo album by King's X guitarist Ty Tabor. All songs were written and recorded by Tabor at Alien Beans studio in Katy, TX. between March 2005 and June 2006.

Track listing
"Ride"
"Stalker"
"I Know What I'm Missing"
"Afraid"
"Play"
"Beautiful Sky"
"She's A Tree"
"Take It Back"
"Wading In"
"Thankful"
"Pretty Good"

Personnel
Ty Tabor - Vocals, Guitar, Bass
Randy St. John - Drums, Percussion
Wally Farkas - Vocals and Acoustic Guitar on 11
Doug Pinnick - Vocals on 11
James Henry (aka. Eddie Hash) - Dobro on 11

References 

2006 albums
Ty Tabor albums
Inside Out Music albums